Voca is an unincorporated community in McCulloch County, Texas, United States. According to the Handbook of Texas, the community had an estimated population of 56 in 2000.

Voca has a post office with the ZIP code 76887.

References

External links
 

Unincorporated communities in McCulloch County, Texas
Unincorporated communities in Texas